The thin mouse shrew (Myosorex tenuis) is a species of mammal in the family Soricidae found in South Africa and possibly Mozambique.

References

External link

Endemic fauna of South Africa
Myosorex
Mammals of South Africa
Taxonomy articles created by Polbot
Mammals described in 1905
Taxa named by Oldfield Thomas